Noyan (pl. noyad), or Toyon, was a Central Asian title of authority which was used to refer to civil-military leaders of noble ancestry in the Central Asian Khanates with origins in Noyon, which was used as a title of authority in the Chagatai Khanate of the Mongol Empire. In modern times, Noyan is used as a given name or surname in Asia and throughout Central Asia meaning "the lord", "the prince", "the protector", "the commander-in-chief".

Pre-Genghisid period
 
Initially, Noyan was a title for chieftains of Mongolian nomad communities.

Mongol Empire and successor states

Under Genghis Khan the term "Noyon" applied to leaders of Tumens and Mingghans, social-military units of 10,000 and 1,000 households respectively, each of them with one recruitable soldier. In times of peace the Noyons ruled as lords over these households and governed the use of the pasture lands. In times of war they leaded the warriors of their Tumens and Mingghans.  During conquests, Noyons used to receive territories for administration and they effectively became aristocracy, into the 20th century. Noyons were above the ordinary Mongols in social rank but below the descendants of Genghis Khan. They were sometimes called emir or bey in the Ulus of Jochi, the Ilkhanate and the Chagatai Khanate while historical records of the Yuan dynasty of China gave the equivalent as guanren (官人). 

Usually, "Noyon" followed the name of a person similar to the usage of the title "Khan" or "Bey".

Qing dynasty

The Qing dynasty of China, which ruled Mongolia from 1694 to 1911, entrusted rule in Mongolia to the descendants of Genghis Khan, who were also called Noyon. The term Noyon in this epoch acquired the connotation of nobleman, since Mongolia was mostly at peace. After 1921 the word Darga (boss) replaced the aristocratic Noyon as the term for officials.

Modern Mongolia
In modern Mongolian, the word is used as a form of address similar to "Mister" or "Monsieur".

Religious context
In the mongolian shamanism and folk religion the Noyad are a class of local spirits. They are regarded as descendants of gods or clan elders.

Noyon is also used as an honorary title in mongolian buddhism for the incarnation line of the Noyon Khutagt.

Notable Noyons
Qarachar Barlas
Qubilai Barlas
Ichil Barlas
Yesunte Möngke Barlas*
Baiju
Chormaqan
Jebe
Subutai
Dulduityn Danzanravjaa (the Fifth Noyon Khutagt)
Muqali
Boroldai*
Taghachar*

Notes

Positions of authority
Men's social titles